The Z1619 or   Gahira (Raozan)–Fatikchhari Road  is a transportation artery in Bangladesh, which connects N106 National Highway from Gahira (Raozan Upazila|Raozan) with Regional Highway R160 at Fatikchhari Municipality.

Junction list

The entire route is in Chittagong District.

Markets crossed
 Nanupur Bazar
 Mohammad Takir Hat

See also
N1 (Bangladesh)

References

National Highways in Bangladesh